Badalwas is a village in Sikar tehsil of Sikar district in Rajasthan, India. It is situated 18 kilometres from Sikar. This is an old historical village founded 600 years ago.

Old mansions 
 Thakur Ranjeet Singh mansion
 thakur Deep Singh Mansion
 rao ji ka kotadi

Popular places 
 Raghunathji ka Mandir, Badalwas
 Shahid Amarchand Jhunjhar ji temple, Badalwas
 Karni Mata Mandir jalya
 Shivsnakar Mahadev ka mandir
 Shree Shati Mata
 Mawdi Mata Ji, Badalwas
 Baba Ramdevji Temple, Bus stand Badalwas
 Shree krani mata Temple, Badalwas
 Gorana, Badalwas

Population data  
The total number of families is 700.  In Badalwas village population of children with age 0-18 is 446 which makes up 13.73% of total population of village. Average Sex Ratio of Badalwas village is 947 which is higher than Rajasthan state average of 928. Child Sex Ratio for the Badalwas as per census is 828, lower than Rajasthan average of 888.population data 2011

References

External links
 
https://www.indiagrowing.com/Rajasthan/Sikar/Sikar/Badalwas
https://www.getatoz.com/postoffice/badalwas/332023
https://www.newsnationtv.com/pincodes/rajasthan/sikar/badalwas-bo

 
Cities and towns in Sikar district
Shekhawati
Thar Desert